Kim Gandy (born January 25, 1954) is an American feminist who from 2001 to 2009 was the president of the National Organization for Women. Since 2012, she has been the  president and CEO of the National Network to End Domestic Violence. In 2009, Gandy was a resident fellow at the Institute of Politics at the John F. Kennedy School of Government at Harvard University in Cambridge, Massachusetts. From January 2010 to October 2012 she was vice president and general counsel at the Feminist Majority Foundation in Arlington, Virginia.

Life and career
Gandy was born in Bossier City in northwestern Louisiana, to Alfred Kenneth Gandy (1928–2010), a native of Bossier City, and Roma Rae (Young) Gandy (1927–1998), a native of Pennsylvania. Her father was an officer of the former Bossier Bank and Trust Company, an institution organized during the 1920s by her grandfather, W.A. Gandy. After Roma's death, A. K. Gandy married the former Shirley S. Lacobee (1925–2004) of Shreveport. Kim Gandy had a younger sister Kellie Ann, who, like their mother, died of cancer.

Kim Gandy graduated from Louisiana Tech University in Ruston, the seat of Lincoln Parish, where she earned a Bachelor of Science degree in mathematics.

Having taken a job with American Telephone and Telegraph, Gandy became outraged that the firm required her husband's permission for employee benefits. In 1973, she joined Louisiana NOW and devoted the next several years to the campaign that overturned the state's Head and Master law, which gave husbands unilateral control over all property jointly owned by a married couple. Inspired by her activism in NOW, she studied at Loyola University New Orleans School of Law where she was a member of the Loyola Law Review and the National Moot Court Team. She graduated from Loyola in 1978.

Gandy served as a senior assistant district attorney in New Orleans and later opened a private trial practice, litigating cases seeking fair treatment for women. She served as president of Louisiana NOW from 1979 through 1981, national secretary of NOW from 1987 to 1991, and executive vice president of NOW from 1991 to 2001. She was elected national NOW president in 2001 and re-elected to a second term in 2005. She was term-limited in 2009.

In 2008, Gandy defended presidential candidate Hillary Clinton from a comment made by MSNBC host Chris Matthews that Clinton had become a U.S. senator and a possible frontrunning candidate for President because her husband, former U.S. President Bill Clinton, had "messed around". Gandy charged that Matthews "is a repeat offender when it comes to sexist attitudes toward women politicians. . . . I wasn't really looking for an apology. I was looking for a behavior change, and for him to treat female politicians the same way as [he treats] male politicians."

Gandy is married to Christopher "Kip" Lornell, an American ethnomusicologist and professor of music at George Washington University in Washington, D.C. The couple have two daughters.

References

External links
 NOW Officers: Kim Gandy – President
 2005 National NOW Elections – Candidate Information
 Institute of Politics, Kennedy School of Government
 Feminist Majority Foundation
 

1954 births
Living people
Louisiana Tech University alumni
People from New Orleans
People from Shreveport, Louisiana
Presidents of the National Organization for Women
Loyola University New Orleans alumni
American feminists
Women in Louisiana politics
21st-century American women